Heinrich Schmidt (10 January 1912 – 16 August 1988) was a German footballer who played for Borussia Neunkirchen, 1. FC Saarbrücken and the Saarland national team as a defender.

References

1912 births
1988 deaths
German footballers
Saar footballers
Saarland international footballers
1. FC Saarbrücken players
Association football defenders
Footballers from Saarland
Sportspeople from Saarbrücken